Les B.B. (pronounced leh beh beh) was a Canadian band from the province of Quebec. It had great success in the 1980s and the early 1990s. It is made up of Patrick Bourgeois (vocals, guitar, bass), Alain Lapointe (keyboards, guitar, bass and backing vocals) and François Jean (drums). Bourgeois, the main songwriter for the band's releases, died in November 2017.

Bourgeois's son, Ludovick Bourgeois, is a pop singer who was the winner of the fifth season of La Voix.

Discography

Albums
1988: Les B.B. (200,000 copies sold)
1991: Snob (300,000 copies sold)
1994: 3
2004: Bonheur facile
2011: Univers

Live albums
1993: Une nuit avec les B.B. (live album)

Compilation albums
2007: Tous les succès

Songs / videography
(Selective)
"Loulou"
"Fais attention"
"Parfum du passé"
"T'es dans la lune"
"Rose café"
"Snob"
"Donne-moi ma chance"
"La Sirène"
"Seul au combat"
"Tu ne sauras jamais"
"Je tends les bras"
"Autre chose"
"Dernier mot"
"Je suis à toi"
"Univers"

References

External links
Official website

Canadian rock music groups
Musical groups from Quebec
Musical groups established in 1989
Musical groups disestablished in 2017
1989 establishments in Quebec
2017 disestablishments in Quebec